This is a list of awards and nominations received by Lovelyz, a South Korean girl group formed in 2014 by Woollim Entertainment, As of 2021 the group received 10 awards.

Awards and nominations

References

Awards
Lists of awards received by South Korean musician